PagePlus was a desktop publishing (page layout) program developed by Serif for Microsoft Windows. The first version was released in 1991 as the first commercial sub-£100 DTP package for Microsoft Windows. The final release was PagePlus X9, which was released in November 2016. In June 2019 it was officially replaced by Serif with Affinity Publisher.

History 

PagePlus was first launched in 1990 and was the first sub-£100 desktop publishing program for Windows 3.0. Three years later, in spring 1993, PagePlus 2 was released and provided full colour printing support. Following this release, a new version of the product was released on a roughly annual basis.

Serif did a complete rewrite of the original program source code for the release of PagePlus version 8. Despite the rewrite, at that time the program name was retained and the version number was simply incremented. Version 8 was able to read data files created in previous versions 1 to 7.

Replacement by Affinity Publisher 

Serif announced that PagePlus X9 was to be the final PagePlus release. The last build issued to date is v19.0.2.22 from 28 April 2017. Serif ceased further development of all "Plus" products to focus efforts on their 'Affinity' product line.

Serif began rewriting their DTP software, to allow a multi-platform implementation, and allow new methods of internal program operation with more modern Operating Systems and the typical current (2018/9) configuration of PCs.

A public beta of Serif's Affinity Publisher (the closest of the Affinity applications to PagePlus functionality) was launched in August 2018, followed by the first full version of the application in June 2019.

Overview 

While PagePlus was generally targeted at the "entry level" DTP user, some of the functionality present in the market leading applications (Quark's XPress and Adobe's InDesign) is present in PagePlus, such as working in the CMYK colour space, OpenType Feature support, and Optical margin alignment (Optical Justification). PagePlus also has the ability to view, create, edit and publish PDF files, and publish E-books in *.epub or *mobi formats suitable for the Kindle store. It also includes support for EPUB3 fixed layout eBooks for textbooks, children's books etc.

PagePlus is primarily written in C++ using Visual Studio 2008, with a heavy dependence on the MFC framework. The Windows GDI library was discarded early in development in favour of an in-house composition engine supporting advanced bitmap and typeface operations. The text engine supports Unicode text entry.

Supported platforms 

PagePlus was first developed for 16-bit Microsoft Windows v3.0 running on PC/MS DOS but the final releases support Windows XP, Windows Vista (32/64bit), Windows 7 (32/64bit), Windows 8 (32/64bit) and Windows 10 (32/64bit).

PagePlus data file compatibility 

The format of the .ppp data file has also evolved over time. Until the switch to an XML-based format with version X3, each release of PagePlus could read current and previous version data file formats. Before X3 there was no facility to save back into an earlier format, so a modified file could not be read by any version previous to the version that was last used to save it. However, once the change was made to XML format at X3, later data files from release X4 to X9 inclusive could be read by earlier versions (back to X3), though with the loss of any unsupported features.

The backwards compatibility of being able to read older non-XML .ppp datafile versions was dropped from later 64-bit PagePlus releases. As a result, PPX6 (2011) is the last release that can read PP5 (1997) and PP3 (1994) format data files after a standard install on a Windows 64-bit system. To read older files with PagePlus versions X7, X8 and X9 on a 64-bit Windows system, a special manual 32-bit PagePlus installation must be done from the program disc or downloaded file.

Also, when Serif ended development of PagePlus with version X9 and began concentrating on its Affinity line, they did not include in Affinity Publisher the ability to import .ppp format files from the X6–X9 versions into Affinity; neither did they provide a batch conversion program into Affinity format.  This upset many long-time PagePlus users, who felt they had supported the company for many years, and often had hundreds of documents in the .ppp format.  Serif's suggestion was to redo the document in Affinity Publisher, or export the file in .pdf format, and then import into Affinity (which makes it a picture and loses all page formatting info).  Many users did not feel this was adequate.

Version history 

 PagePlus: 1990
 PagePlus 2: 1993
 PagePlus 3: 1994
 PagePlus 4: 1996
 PagePlus 5: 1997 (revised for XP compatibility and reissued in 2002)
 PagePlus 6: 1999
 PagePlus 7: 1 October 2000
 PagePlus 8: 2001
 PagePlus 8: PDF Edition, 9 September 2002
 PagePlus 9: September 2003
 PagePlus 10: 11 October 2004
 PagePlus 11: 3 October 2005
 PagePlus X2: 19 February 2007
 PagePlus X3: 21 April 2008
 PagePlus X4: 11 September 2009
 PagePlus X5: 18 October 2010
 PagePlus X6: 5 December 2011
 PagePlus X7: 3 June 2013
 PagePlus X8: 4 August 2014
 PagePlus X9: 16 November 2015

See also 

 Comparison of desktop publishing software
 Desktop publishing
 DrawPlusvector graphics editor
 List of desktop publishing software

References

Bibliography 

 PagePlus official user guide

External links 

 
 The CommunityPlus Forums were closed on 5th July 2022
 Alfred's Serif Users' Forums is a fan-based forum for users of the legacy Serif products

Reviews 

 #1 DTP product on TopTenReviews.com
 Affordable Desktop Publishing From Serif – PC Mag
 Comparative Review of Recent Versions
 Review of PagePlus X5 – PC PRO

1990 software
C++ software
Desktop publishing software
Windows-only software